The 1878 Birthday Honours were appointments by Queen Victoria to various orders and honours to reward and highlight good works by citizens of the British Empire. The appointments were made to celebrate the official birthday of the Queen, and were published in The London Gazette in May 1878.

The recipients of honours are displayed here as they were styled before their new honour, and arranged by honour, with classes (Knight, Knight Grand Cross, etc.) and then divisions (Military, Civil, etc.) as appropriate.

United Kingdom and British Empire

Viscount and Earl
 The Right Honourable Thomas George, Lord Northbrook  lately Her Majesty's Viceroy and Governor-General of India, by the names, styles, and titles of Viscount Baring, of Lee, in the county of Kent, and Earl of Northbrook, in the county of Southampton

Baronetcies
The Right Honourable Sir Henry Bartle Edward Frere  of Wimbledon, in the County of Surrey

Knight Bachelor

Thomas Elder, Member of the Legislative Council of the Colony of South Australia
Salvatore Naudi, Doctor of Laws, Judge of the Court of Appeal of the Island of Malta
Edward Eyre Williams, late Puisne Judge of the Supreme Court of the Colony of Victoria

The Most Honourable Order of the Bath

Knight Grand Cross of the Order of the Bath (GCB)

Civil Division
Sir Henry Bartle Edward Frere

Knight Commander of the Order of the Bath (KCB)

Civil Division
Charles, Lord Suffield, of the Household of His Royal Highness the Prince of Wales

The Most Exalted Order of the Star of India

Knight Grand Commander (GCSI)

Knight Commander (KCSI)
The Honourable Ashley Eden  Lieutenant-Governor of Bengal
Stuart Colvin Bayley  Bengal Civil Service, Secretary to the Government of Bengal in the Judicial and Political Departments

Companion (CSI)
James Gibbs, Bombay Civil Service, Member of the Council of the Governor of Bombay
Colonel Charles James Merriman, Royal (late Bombay) Engineers, Superintending Engineer for Irrigation in Sind
James Bellett Richey, Bombay Civil Service, Extra First Assistant to the Collector and Magistrate of Kaira for the Panch Mahals
Lieutenant-Colonel William Scott Drever, Madras Staff Corps, Commissioner, Madras Town Police
John Henry Garstin, Madras Civil Service, Collector and Magistrate, South Arcot
Robert Davidson, Madras Civil Service, District and Sessions Judge, Chingleput
Charles Alfred Elliott, Bengal Civil Service, Commissioner of Revenue and Circuit, North-Western Provinces
Major Colin Campbell Scott Moncrieff, Royal (late Bengal) Engineers, Chief Engineer, Mysore and Coorg

The Most Distinguished Order of Saint Michael and Saint George

Knight Grand Cross of the Order of St Michael and St George (GCMG)
Major-General Sir William Francis Drummond Jervois  Royal Engineers, Governor of the Colony of South Australia
Sir Alexander Tilloch Galt  Member of the Halifax Fisheries Commission

Knight Commander of the Order of St Michael and St George (KCMG)

Albert Smith, Minister of the Marine for the Dominion of Canada, and lately employed in connection with the Halifax Fisheries Commission
Henry Turner Irving  Governor of the Island of Trinidad
Sanford Freeling  Governor of the Gold Coast Colony
Sir James Milne Wilson  lately Premier of the Colony of Tasmania, and now President of the Legislative Council of that Colony
John Hay, President of the Legislative Council of the Colony of New South Wales
Archibald Michie  formerly Attorney-General and Minister of Justice in the Colony of Victoria, and now Agent-General in England for that Colony
Frederick B. T. Carter, late Premier and Attorney-General of the Island of Newfoundland

Companion of the Order of St Michael and St George (CMG)
Anthony O'Grady Lefroy, Treasurer of the Colony of Western Australia
Doctor Francis Reid, Chief Medical Officer of the Island of Mauritius
George Henry Kendrick Thwaites, Director of the Botanical Gardens in the Island of Ceylon
Colonel William Acland Douglas Anderson, in Command of the Local Military Forces in the Colony of Victoria
Henry Halloran, Principal Under-Secretary for the Colony of New South Wales
Timothy Darling, Senior Unofficial Member of the Executive Council of the Bahama Islands
Colville Arthur Durell Barclay, formerly of Mauritius, and lately Auditor-General of the Island of Ceylon
Colonel George Pomeroy Colley  for services in Natal and South Africa
Captain Francis W. Sullivan  Commodore on the Cape and African Station
Captain Warren, Royal Engineers, Boundary Commissioner, Griqualand West
Captain Matthew J. Blyth, Resident Magistrate, Griqualand East
Captain Charles Mills, Assistant Colonial Secretary, Cape of Good Hope

References

Birthday Honours
1878 awards
1878 in India
1878 in the United Kingdom